Asiaabad or Aseyaabad may refer to:
Asiaabad, Kerman
Asiaabad, Qom